MagIndustries is a Canadian potash mining company operating in the Republic of Congo, majority owned by China-based Evergreen Holding Group.

History

Establishment
The company was established in 1997 as Congo Minerals Inc. and set out to be a low-cost producer of magnesium from the Republic of Congo. In May 1997 it concluded an exploration research agreement with the Congolese Ministry of Mines in the Kouilou Department. The Holle Mine, a former potash producing mine, had once operated in the Kouilou area. 

On the corporate side, the newly established private company converted itself into a publicly traded company by conducting a reverse takeover. In October 1997 the company emerged as the Magnesium Alloy Corporation through amalgamation with Clavos Enterprises, a largely inactive publicly traded company. The executive team at this stage included Chairman and President George Creber, Executive Vice-President William Burton and Vice-President Kim Barkan. The board of directors included the three executives and Stephen Dattels and Patrick Mitchell.

Diversification
The company became engaged in business lines outside of magnesium mining and changed its name in February 2005 to MagIndustries from Magnesium Alloy Corporation to reflect its interests in "multiple businesses and products". The main asset of the company was the potash/magnesium mine in Kouilou under the MagMining division. Besides the main asset there were varied business interests under separate divisions including MagEnergy (refurbishment of the Inga II dam in the DRC); MagForestry (a 68,000 hectare eucalyptus plantation located on the surface of the area where the company held mineral rights); MagMinerals (a potash processing plant near Pointe-Noire); and MagMetals (magnesium smelter next to the potash processing plant).

Concentrating on potash
Starting in 2008, potash enjoyed the limelight as the price of the mineral and key ingredient in chemical fertilizer soared to a record high of around $1,000/tonne and remained high for most of 2009. The primary business of MagIndustries became potash rather than magnesium with namesake mineral of the company relegated to a secondary consideration. The company had announced in 2008 it was shelving the magnesium metal plant to concentrate on advancing the Mengo potash project (formerly called the Kouilou potash project).

The Mengo potash project moved along rapidly in 2007-2009 with favorable developments in financing, fuel supply, marketing, tax, permitting, design and pre-construction. The feasibility study was completed in February 2008. The company entered into a mining investment agreement for the project with the Congolese government in March 2008 under which a tax holiday of 10 years was negotiated. In April 2008 it closed second tranche of a private placement that raised $100 million for the development of the Mengo potash project. These positive developments were reflected in its share price with the company becoming in 2008 the third largest mining company by capitalization on the Toronto Stock Exchange Venture Exchange. In June 2008, it received US$70 million from Ameropa Holding, the receiver of the potash and a major shareholder in the company. The project had large scale energy requirements and need a huge volume of natural gas. To that end the company signed a natural gas supply agreement with Eni to meet its requirements.

Hunt for a strategic buyer
They flip flopped this around different companies trying to shake out all the investors. The TSC Capital Ltd. scam was horrible to witness. They sold off the

MagEnergy portion back to themselves for way too little. They did all kinds of things to shake everyone out so the Burtons and gang could run off with the loot.

Although it had a fair wind with high potash prices especially in 2008 and most of 2009 and pre-construction work and drilling had commenced, the company still

had much difficulty in finding debt financing or the strategic partner necessary to raise the US$1.4 billion necessary to complete development of the Mengo

potash project.[5][11] It raised $26 million in June 2009 through issuance of new shares to tide over the continuation of Phase 1 development as finding debt

financing became prolonged.[11] Separate discussions were held with Chinese state owned enterprises in 2009-10; first with Sinohydro and then with Complant.

The Chinese SOEs were attractive as strategic partners because of deep pockets through links to Chinese banks but the talks fell through in succession. Another

reason for looking for a Chinese tie up according to a company executive was the lack of Western investor interest due to lack of familiarity with Republic of

Congo and perception of heightened country risk.[5] During this period, potash prices dropped precipitously starting in late 2009 with prices reaching around

$500/tonne in January 2010.[3] The company announced an investment in late 2010 with investment company TSC Capital but the proposed deal was

terminated.[12]

Acquisition by Evergreen
In 2011, Evergreen Holding Group, a private Chinese shipbuilder, purchased 76% of the shares of the company for $115 million, and became the controlling 

shareholder.[5] After the acquisition, the company was kept listed on the Toronto Stock Exchange. They bankrupted this company in efforts to avoid accountability

for all the corruption. Last known news was the owner being arrested in Myanmar for "tax evasion" https://splash247.com/former-sinopacific-boss-simon-liang-arrested-in-myanmar/.

They played mind games with the investors as example: there was cause again for optimism in 2013 when the company announced in November that China

Development Bank had provided a 12-month commitment to act as lead arranger in financing of US$740 million for development of the Mengou potash project.

There was still a shortfall in the total funding needed to develop the project and a proposed idea was to carve out the cost of development of the port facility into a

separate build-own-transfer agreement. The stock increased briefly that day but then quickly retreated as if to fake some kind of success when really it was never

going to be. Minority shareholders were targeted and defrauded.

Bribery investigation and collapse
On March 5, 2010 Willy Verbrugghe CEO of MagMinerals filed a statement of claim with the Ontario Superior Court of Justice court file # CV-10-398535 against Magindustries claiming wrongful dismissal for confronting Mr. Burton CEO of Magindusties about his foreign bribes and insider trading. "14. In or about April or May 2008, Verbrugghe learned that Magindustries was illegally providing compensation to government officials in the Democratic Republic of Congo and was party to insider trading. Upon discovery, he confronted Mr. Burton with this knowledge and demanded that it stop immediately. As a direct result and reprisal , in June 2009 Verbrugghe's employment was terminated."  

The insider and manipulative trading practices that went on with this company was very obvious to investors following the on-goings of this company. There was so much corruption that went on with this company you could easily think the RCMP must have been in on it. The optics between Canada and China were too much for little spud to handle and he did not interfere with this investigation by ordering the RCMP to drop it and sweep it all under the rug. It was an isolated event when there was an attempt to medal in the justice system to give SNC Lavalin Inc. a free pass on its bribery crimes. They think they got away with it but nope!!! This thing is coming back to haunt ALL the criminals involved. The company was finally investigated by the Royal Canadian Mounted Police for making corrupt payments to Congolese officials IN JANUARY OF 2015. 

The RCMP raided the Toronto office of the company in January 2015. The company began an independent investigation after the raid and in June 2015 the internal investigation admitted to the allegations that were made against the company in the Information to Obtain Search Warrant authorizing the search of the company offices.[15] It was alleged in the warrant, that the company had made payments and given gifts to Congolese officials including cash payments, a house, furniture, 4x4 vehicles, and ornamental stone lions. The company was unable to fund a continuation of the internal investigation and the controlling shareholder Evergreen Holding Group refused to provide the funds. Evergreen's own financial position deteriorated rapidly and defaulted on a 400 million RMB bond in May 2016.[16] The corruption investigation and lack of funding sent the company into disarray. The company admitted to using secondary bookkeeping records and stopped filing financial reports. The stock ceased trading on the TSX. By June 2015, the board of directors involved in the corruption investigation resigned and the chief financial officer was removed.[17] The company was delisted from the Toronto Stock Exchange in August 2015.[18] There were other reports made to the RCMP about alleged insider trading and manipulative trading practices surrounding the sale of Magindustries to Evergreen Holdings that were never investigated. The RCMP and the Liberal PMO have a lot of explaining to do to the public over their failure to pursue justice in this matter. The CBC news also dropped their coverage of this story even though they were given information of additional crimes. They have now become actively involved and became part of the coverup of these crimes.

Here is the CBC news article https://www.cbc.ca/news/business/magindustries-probed-by-rcmp-over-bribery-allegations-in-congo-1.3091035 . 

Don't forget to check out the RCMP search warrant as it paints a clear picture of what kind of corrupt people were involved https://www.documentcloud.org/documents/2089559-rcmp-search-warrant-ito-for-magindustries-hq.html.  

There are many questions still unanswered as to just why the RCMP so abruptly dropped this case given the company themselves admitted guilt.

https://financialpost.com/commodities/mining/magindustries-reveals-evidence-that-company-paid-major-bribes-in-republic-of-congo

Ultimately, no charges were laid by the RCMP against the company or individuals in connection to the Congolese bribery allegations. https://www.newsfilecorp.com/release/26201/MagIndustries-Reports-No-Charges-from-RCMP-to-the-Company-or-Individuals

Operations and plans
Over the course of the company's history it became engaged in or would shelve pursuit of several areas of business organized as separate divisions in the Republic of Congo and Democratic Republic of Congo.

Potash mining and plant
The prized asset of the company by the late 2000s became the Mengo potash project (formerly called Kouilou potash project). The project was developed within a 136 square km mining license area around the village of Mengo. Pursuant to the project, the company entered into an investment agreement with the Congolese government in late 2008 to construct and operate a mine within the license area for at least 25 years. In 2009, development of the Mengo potash project was in full swing under the MagMining division with the project team having commenced the pre-construction and drilling activities. A total of US$100 million had been spent on project development by 2009. The company also conducted exploration activities around the Mengo potash project. In 2009, it had acquired Potasse du Congo, a Congolese company that held three exploration licenses for potash in the areas of Makola, Loango, and Tchizalamou, all surrounding the Mengo potash project.

The processing plant for the Mengo potash project was developed under the MagMinerals division. The potash processing plant was planned near Pointe-Noire with a planned capacity of 600,000 tpy. The eventual plan was for the potash and magnesium output of the mine to be recovered in the form of brine solution and then processed at both the potash plant and the next door magnesium smelter.

The total development costs of the potash mine and potash processing plant were estimated at US$1.4 billion with a cost of US$723 million in the first phase. During the salad days of the project, construction was set to begin in 2009 with production commencing in 2011 and a second phase modular expansion in 2013.

Magnesium smelter
Under the MagMetals division, a magnesium smelter had been planned with a capacity of 72,000 tpy. Located next to the potash processing plant it would have processed the waste stream from the potash plant to produce magnesium and magnesium alloys.

Hydroelectric dams
The MagEnergy division engaged in the rehabilitation of four of the eight turbines of the Inga II power station, one of two Inga power stations along the Congo River in the DRC. The Inga II dam had not been refurbished since commissioning in 1982. The rehabilitation work started in 2006 with emergency repairs worth about US$24 million but the next phase a US$110 million planned overhaul never got off the ground. It was to receive 50% of the 164 MW restored capacity. Also, the division had the rights to the 250 MW Busanga hydroelectric site in the DRC's Katanga province.

Eucalyptus plantation
The company's MagForestry division oversaw the operations of a 68,000 hectare eucalyptus plantation that produced woodchips for biomass plants. The plantation was located over the surface of the area where the company held mining rights. The plantation had been acquired through transactions made in 2005-6 resulting in the complete purchase of the plantation and by 2007 the company had invested $8 million the plantation and commissioned a woodchip plant in 2008. The plantation was in good operational shape in 2009, employing 400 full-time workers and 1,500 contractors. However, by around September 2014, activity at the plantation declined to a low level. In May 2016, the Chinese Ambassador Xia Huang and Congolese Minister of Forestry Henri Djombo jointly toured the plantation to diagnose the problems. Djombo bombastically proclaimed Congolese were the inventors of eucalyptus cultivation and openly considered transferring the forestry rights held by MagIndustries to Moroccan investors.

References

Mining companies of China
Mining companies of Canada
Potash projects in the Republic of Congo
Companies formerly listed on the Toronto Stock Exchange
1997 establishments in the Republic of the Congo
Magnesium mines
Companies established in 1997